This is a list of railroad companies which currently or formerly operated at least partially in the U.S. state of Connecticut.

Active railroads

Freight carriers

Passenger carriers

Heritage railroads

Defunct railroads

Street railroads 
Entries in this list were interurbans, streetcars, or other electric railroads dedicated to passenger transport.

Not completed
New York and Boston Rapid Transit Company

Bibliography

Notes

References 

 
 
Connecticut
Railroads